Otis Hill (born 31 March 1974) is an American former professional basketball player. He played as a power forward. He is a graduate of Pleasantville High School in New York State, played basketball there and won many awards. At Pleasantville High School, Otis was also a standout in football and a member of the 1991 undefeated season when the team was ranked #1 in the state. Otis went on to play at Syracuse University, and professionally  in Belgium, Spain (LEB), Italy, Israel, Poland, and for BC Odessa in the Ukrainian Basketball SuperLeague, before retiring in 2009 .

References

External links
EuroCup Profile
OrangeHoops.org Profile

1974 births
Living people
American expatriate basketball people in Belgium
American expatriate basketball people in Croatia
American expatriate basketball people in the Dominican Republic
American expatriate basketball people in Israel
American expatriate basketball people in Italy
American expatriate basketball people in Poland
American expatriate basketball people in Spain
American expatriate basketball people in Turkey
American expatriate basketball people in Ukraine
American men's basketball players
Antwerp Giants players
Basketball players from New York (state)
Basket Zaragoza players
BC Odesa players
Connecticut Pride players
Ironi Nahariya players
Ironi Ramat Gan players
Israeli Basketball Premier League players
KK Split players
KK Włocławek players
Orlandina Basket players
People from Pleasantville, New York
Polonia Warszawa (basketball) players
Power forwards (basketball)
Sportspeople from Westchester County, New York
Syracuse Orange men's basketball players